Merzig (Moselle Franconian: Meerzisch/Miërzësch) is a town in Saarland, Germany. It is the capital of the district Merzig-Wadern, with about 30,000 inhabitants in 17 municipalities on 108 km². It is situated on the river Saar, approx. 35 km south of Trier, and 35 km northwest of Saarbrücken.

History

Evolution of the name

In addition to the above, the city was known under French rule as Mercy.

Subdivisions

Merzig was created in 1974 as part of the territorial reform in Saarland. The present-day town consists of the previous town of Merzig and 16 surrounding former municipalities. The population of the present town, including all outlying districts (as of June 30, 2011):

Culture and sights

Museums
 Expeditionary Museum Werner Freund
 Fine mechanical museum in the Fellenbergmühle
 Museum of Local History in Fellenberg Castle
 B-Werk Besseringen
 Saarland Psychiatric Museum

Buildings
 Church of St. Peter
 Historic townhouse („Altes Rathaus“)
 Diverse baroque buildings such as Halfenhaus, Staadt-Marx's Bürgerhaus, Hilbringer Schlösschen, Abteihof Besseringen ("Zehnt-Haus"), former residence of Christian Kretzschmar in Trierer Straße (all 18th century)
 Various interesting buildings of the 19th and early 20th centuries such as Villa Fuchs, Protestant church, churches in Hilbringen (St. Peter in chains) and Besseringen (Sacred Heart Church), Lothringer Hof, station, main building of the former state hospital, Art Nouveau buildings in Trierer Straße, former jam factory (previous monastery)
 Various chapels worth seeing, such as St. Mary's Chapel, St. Cross Chapel, Kreuzberg Chapel, Josef Chapel, Harlinger Chapel, Old Wellinger Chapel, St. Clement Chapel (Menningen)
 Seffersbach Bridge, 1901, last preserved suspension belt bridge "System Möller" in Saarland
 Catholic parish church of St. Agatha (Merchingen)
 Catholic parish church of St. Mary Magdalene (Brotdorf)
 Catholic parish church of St. Martin (Bietzen)
 Catholic parish church of St. Josef

Parks
 Bürgerpark Besseringen
 Garden of the Senses on the Kreuzberg
 Orchids on the Nackberg at Hilbringen
 Town park

Other attractions
 B-Werk Besseringen (Westwall Bunkeranlage), on the B 51 between Merzig and Besseringen
 Public indoor swimming pool „Das Bad“
 Bietzener healing spring on the B 51 in the direction of Beckingen
 Public natural swimming pool Heilborn
 Sculptor symposium stones at the border
 Monastery St. Gangolf, between Besseringen and Mettlach
 Museum railway (to Losheim)
 Animal enclosure at Blättelbornweiher
 Wolf enclosure in the Kammerforst
 Kreuzbergkapelle with views over almost the entire city and the Merzig basin
 Kletterhafen - Europe's largest free-standing climbing park

Sport
Merzig is the birthplace of footballer Kevin Trapp and tennis player Benjamin Becker.

Musical theatre
Since 2012 Merzig stages musicals for two months each year, starring famous German musical actors like Uwe Kröger. The venue is a huge marquee, called 'Zeltpalast' (marquee palace).

 2012: Hairspray
 2013: Burlesque
 2014: The Addams Family, German debut 
 2015: La Cage aux Folles
 2016: The Addams Family (off season production in February)
 2016: 9 to 5, German debut

Twin towns – sister cities

Merzig is twinned with:
 Luckau, Germany
 Saint-Médard-en-Jalles, France

Notable people
Franz-Josef Röder (1909–1979), politician (CDU)
Susanne Fontaine (born 1961), musicologist
Kevin Trapp (born 1990), footballer

References

External links

Merzig-Wadern
Duchy of Lorraine
Districts of the Rhine Province